Detyrosination is a form of posttranslational modification that occurs on alpha-tubulin. It consists of the removal of the C-terminal tyrosine to expose a glutamate at the newly formed C-terminus. Tubulin polymers, called microtubules, that contain detyrosinated alpha-tubulin are usually referred to as Glu-microtubules while unmodified polymers are called Tyr-microtubules.

The detyrosynating activity was first identified in the late 1970s. It is a slow acting enzyme that uses polymeric tubulin as a substrate. As a result, only stabilized microtubules accumulate this particular modification. Tubulin detyrosination is reversed by the tubulin-tyrosine ligase, which acts only on alpha-tubulin monomer. Since the majority of microtubules are very dynamic, they do not contain much detyrosinated tubulin.

See also
Polyglutamylation
Polyglycylation
Acetylation

References
Vasohibins/SVBP are tubulin carboxypeptidases (TCPs) that regulate neuron differentiation.

Aillaud C, Bosc C, Peris L, Bosson A, Heemeryck P, Van Dijk J, Le Friec J, Boulan B, Vossier F, Sanman LE, Syed S, Amara N, Couté Y, Lafanechère L, Denarier E, Delphin C, Pelletier L, Humbert S, Bogyo M, Andrieux A, Rogowski K, Moutin MJ.

Science. 2017 Dec 15;358(6369):1448-1453. doi: 10.1126/science.aao4165. Epub 2017 Nov 16.

PMID: 29146868

Post-translational modification
Protein structure